Mavrin (Маврин), formerly known as Mavrik (Маврик), is a Russian heavy/progressive metal band formed and led by former Aria guitarist Sergey Mavrin.

Foundation of Mavrin

In 1997, Sergey offered to Kipelov (who was back in Aria) to record together the combined album, which might include their songs which were refused by Aria or did not fit into Aria's style. In 1997 they released the LP entitled Kipelov and Mavrin - Smutnoye Vremia ("Time of Troubles"), which included 10 tracks.

Songs from this album became the main concert material for Sergey's new project: a band he started in 1998, which was entitled "Mavrik" due to his familiar nickname. Arthur Berkut (ex-Autograph) joined "Mavrik" as vocalist on its first album Skitaletz (Wanderer), where Mavrin played guitars, bass, and keyboards. The genre of the album was progressive/heavy metal. Vladimir Holstinin was a guest guitarist on 'Skitaletz'. Shortly after the album's release and subsequent touring, Berkut left the band, to be replaced by classically trained vocalist Stas Vytart.

In 2000, the band released Neformat-1, which took the hard rock sound of Skitaletz in a more experimental direction, while displaying some hints of heavier guitar sound on tracks such as "Staya" ("The Pack"), "Ei Chelovek" ("Hey Man"), and "V Dikom Pole" ("In the Wild Field"). However, Vytart's stage presence did not seem to fit with Mavrin's concept of the band's live show, and shortly after the album's release he was replaced by Berkut, who returned to the band and played assorted shows in support of the album.

During the recording of the third album, Himichesky Son ("Chemical Sleep", 2001), Artur Berkut often failed to show up in studio, and finally, Sergey had to fire him. When Berkut once was asked why he had left Mavrik, he replied: "You'd better ask Lena Mavrina about it," (meaning Sergey's wife). Artem Styrov was hired as the new vocalist. The album displayed a much heavier, guitar-oriented sound that was firmly within the heavy metal genre. Some of the songs are still live staples of Mavrin's set as of this writing. Since Chemical Sleep, all albums have been released by "Sergey Mavrin" as artist, not "Mavrik". This was done after consulting the IronD record label, which recommended them to take a more serious title.

Back to Mavrin
In 2004 Sergey Mavrin reunited his own band. Artem Styrov decided to come back, though Harkov stayed with Kipelov. Alexander Shwetz from the Russian band Nephilim became the new bass player. The same year Zapreshennaya Realnost ("Forbidden Reality") was released, which became the most commercially successful album for Mavrin. The band started touring all over Russia with the new material. In 2005 Styrov was dismissed due to his health problems - he struggled to sing the two-hour-long gigs. His successor was 18-year-old Andrey Lefler. Mavrin and his band participated in Aria's twentieth-anniversary gig and the bands toured together in Ukraine in the winter of 2005. After it, Mavrin released a new album Otkrovenie ("Revelation").

Band members
Current:
 Sergey Mavrin (lead guitar, keyboards)
 Evgeniy Kolchin (vocals)
 Yuri Alexeyev (rhythm guitar)
 Danila Naumov (drums)

Former members include:
 Arthur Berkut (vocals)
 Andrey Lefler (vocals)
 Ilya Lemur (vocals)
 Alexey Kharkov (bass)
 Pavel Elkind (drums)
 Stanislav Vitart (vocals)
 Alexander Mosinian (bass)
 Pavel Chinekov (drums)
 Alexander Schwetz (bass)
 Pavel Pazon (drums)
 Alexander Karpukhin (drums)
 Rinat Mukhametjanov (drums)
 Artem Styrov (vocals)
 Dmitiy Zavidov (drums) 
 Nikita Marchenko (bass)

Timeline

Discography

Albums
 Skitaletz (Wanderer, 1998)
 Neformat (Non-format, 2000)
 Himichesky Son (Chemical Sleep, 2001)
 Odinochestvo (Loneliness, 2002)
 Zapreshennaya Realnost (Forbidden Reality, 2004)
 Otkrovenie (Revelation, 2006)
 Live (2007)
 Fortuna (Fortune, 2007)
 Moya svoboda (My freedom, 2010)
 Protivostoyaniye (The Rivalry, 2012)
 Neotvratimoye (The Inevitable, 2015)

Singles
 Obratnaya Storona Realnosti (Other Side of Reality, 2005)
 Neformat 2 (Non-format 2, 2010)
 Illyuziya (Illusion, 2012)

References

External links
 Official website 
 Concert review from the Ariafest
 Mavrin entry at Encyclopaedia Metallum

Musical groups from Moscow
Russian heavy metal musical groups
Russian progressive metal musical groups
Musical groups established in 1998
Musical quintets